Khursheed Aslam (April 6, 1936 – 1993) was a field hockey player from Pakistan. He is a gold medalist from 1960 Summer Olympics.

References

External links
 

1936 births
1993 deaths
Field hockey players at the 1960 Summer Olympics
Olympic field hockey players of Pakistan
Pakistani male field hockey players
Olympic gold medalists for Pakistan
Medalists at the 1960 Summer Olympics
Asian Games medalists in field hockey
Field hockey players at the 1958 Asian Games
Asian Games gold medalists for Pakistan
Medalists at the 1958 Asian Games
Olympic medalists in field hockey
20th-century Pakistani people